XEPLE-AM is a radio station on 1040 AM in Palenque, Chiapas. It is part of the state-owned Radio Chiapas state network and is known as Radio Palenque.

XEPLE signed on June 23, 1991.

References

Radio stations in Chiapas
Public radio in Mexico